The concept of a double group was introduced by Hans Bethe for the quantitative treatment of magnetochemistry of complexes of ions like Ti3+, that have a single unpaired electron in the metal ion's valence electron shell and to complexes of ions like Cu2+ which have a single "vacancy" in the valence shell.  

In the specific instances of complexes of metal ions that have the electronic configurations 3d1, 3d9, 4f1 and 4f13, rotation by 360° must be treated as a symmetry operation R, in a separate class from the identity operation E. This arises from the nature of the wave function for electron spin. A double group is formed by combining a molecular point group with the group {E, R} that has two symmetry operations, identity and rotation by 360°. The double group has twice the number of symmetry operations compared to the molecular point group.

Background

In magnetochemistry, the need for a double group arises in a very particular circumstance, namely, in the treatment of the paramagnetism of complexes of a metal ion in whose electronic structure there is a single electron (or its equivalent, a single vacancy) in a metal ion's d- or f- shell. This occurs, for example, with the elements copper and silver in the +2 oxidation state, where there is a single vacancy in a d-electron shell, with titanium(III) which has a single electron in the 3d shell and with cerium(III) which has a single electron in the 4f shell.

In group theory, the character , for rotation of a molecular wavefunction for angular momentum by an angle α is given by 

where ; angular momentum is the vector sum of orbital and spin angular momentum. This formula applies with most paramagnetic chemical compounds of transition metals and lanthanides. However, in a complex containing an atom with a single electron in the valence shell, the character, for a rotation through an angle of  about an axis through that atom is equal to minus the character for a rotation through an angle of  

The change of sign cannot be true for an identity operation in any point group.
A character table for the double group D4 is as follows. The new symmetry operations are shown in the second row of the table.
 
<div style=display:inline-table>
{| class="wikitable"|+ style="text-align: center;"
|+ Character table: double group D4 
|- 
!D4 ||E || ||C4||C43||C2||2C'2||2C''2
|-
! || ||R ||C4R||C43R||C2R||2C'2R||2C''2R
|-
!A1
||1||1||1||1||1||1||1|1
|-
!A'''2
||1||1||1||1||1||1|-1||-1
|-
!B1
||1||1||-1||-1||1||1||-1
|-
!B2
||1||1||-1||-1||1||-1||1
|-
!E1
||2||-2||0||0||-2||0||0
|-
!E2
||2||-2||√2||-√2||0||0||0
|-
!E3
||2 ||-2 ||-√2||√2 ||0 ||0 ||0 
|}

The symmetry operations such as C4 and C4R belong to the same class but the column header is shown, for convenience, in two rows, rather than C4, C4R in a single row . 

Character tables for the double groups T',  O', Td', D3h', C6v', D6', D2d', C4v', D4', C3v', D3', C2v', D2' and R(3)' are given in Salthouse and Ware. 

 Applications 

The need for a double group occurs, for example, in the treatment of magnetic properties of 6-coordinate complexes of copper(II). The electronic configuration of the central Cu2+ ion can be written as [Ar]3d9. It can be said that there is a single vacancy, or hole, in the copper 3d-electron shell, which can contain up to 10 electrons. The ion [Cu(H2O)6]2+ is a typical example of a compound with this characteristic.
(1) Six-coordinate complexes of the Cu(II) ion, with the generic formula [CuL6]2+,  are subject to the Jahn-Teller effect so that the symmetry is reduced from octahedral (point group Oh) to tetragonal (point group D4h). Since d orbitals are centrosymmetric the related atomic term symbols can be classified in the subgroup D4 .
(2) To a first approximation spin-orbit coupling can be ignored and the magnetic moment is then predicted  to be 1.73 Bohr magnetons, the so-called spin-only value. However, for a more accurate prediction spin-orbit coupling must be taken into consideration. This means that the relevant quantum number is J, where J = L + S. 
(3) When J is half-integer, the character for a rotation by an angle of α + 2π radians is equal to minus the character for rotation by an angle α. This cannot be true for an identity in a point group. Consequently, a group must be used in which rotations by α + 2π are classed as symmetry operations distinct from rotations by an angle α. This group is known as the double group, D4'.

With species such as the square-planar complex of the silver(II) ion [AgF4]2- the relevant double group is also D4'; deviations from the spin-only value are greater as the magnitude of spin-orbit coupling is greater for silver(II) than for copper(II). 

A double group is also used for some compounds of titanium in the +3 oxidation state. Titanium(III) has a single electron in the 3d shell; the magnetic moments of its complexes have been found to lie in the range 1.63 - 1.81 B.M. at room temperature. The double group O''' is used to classify their electronic states.

The cerium(III) ion, Ce3+, has a single electron in the 4f shell. The magnetic properties of octahedral complexes of this ion are treated using the double group O.

When a cerium(III) ion is encapsulated in a C60 cage, the formula of the endohedral fullerene is written as {Ce3+@C603-}.  The magnetic properties of the compound are treated using the icosahedral double group I2h.

Free radicals
Double groups may be used in connection with free radicals. This has been illustrated for the species CH3F+ and CH3BF2+ which both contain a single unpaired electron.

See also 
 Molecular symmetry
 Point group
 Magnetochemistry

References

Further reading 

Group theory
Molecular physics
Theoretical chemistry
Materials science